{{Automatic_taxobox
| image = Catastega aceriella larva.jpg
| image_caption = Catastega aceriella
| taxon = Catastega
| authority = Clemens, 1861
| subdivision_ranks = Species
| subdivision = 
}}Catastega' is a genus of moths belonging to the family Tortricidae.

SpeciesCatastega aceriella Clemens, 1861Catastega adobe Brown, 1992Catastega marmoreana (Heinrich, 1923)Catastega nebula Brown, 1992Catastega plicata Brown, 1992Catastega spectra Brown, 1992Catastega strigatella Brown, 1992Catastega timidella Clemens, 1861Catastega triangulana'' Brown, 1992

See also
List of Tortricidae genera

References

External links
tortricidae.com

Eucosmini
Tortricidae genera